Tera-machi is a Hiroden station on the Hiroden Yokogawa Line, located in Hirose-machi, Nishi-ku, Hiroshima. It is operated by the Hiroshima Electric Railway.

Routes
There are two routes that serve Tera-machi Station:
 Yokogawa Station - Hiroden-honsha-mae Route
 Yokogawa Station - Eba Route

Station layout
The station consists of two staggered side platforms serving two tracks. There are roofs providing shelter for the whole length of the platforms. Access to the platforms are via crosswalks.

Adjacent stations

Surrounding area
Hirose Elementary School

History
Opened as "Nishino-kouji" on November 1, 1917.
Renamed to "Tera-machi-ura" in 1927.
Renamed to the present name "Tera-machi" station on April 1, 1965.

See also
Hiroden Streetcar Lines and Routes

External links

Tera-machi Station
Railway stations in Japan opened in 1917